Richard Towers (Born Richard Hayles on 8 August 1979) is a British former heavyweight professional boxer. In 2012, Towers won the EBU-EU (European Union) heavyweight title.

Imprisonment

Richard Towers (then known as Hayles) was imprisoned for 13 years after being part of a gang which inflicted three days of agony on a man who was held at gunpoint, and tortured with a steam iron, hammer and stun gun. He played no part in the man's ordeal but was involved in the kidnap which led to a £150,000 ransom demand. Towers served six and a half years before his release.

Boxing career

Amateur career

Towers has won all but one of his amateur fights whilst waiting to get a professional licence. The licence could not be granted until he finished his probationary period.

Professional career
2009

Towers turned professional on 13 June 2009, scoring a points victory against Chris Woollas. The following month Towers scored another points victory in his second bout against Howard Daley. Towers scored his first stoppage victory in a rematch with Chris Woollas, the referee ended the fight in the second round after Woollas was knocked down for a third time. Towers fought in another three bouts in 2009, against Michal Skierniewski, Jason Callum and Lee Mountford, winning all within the scheduled rounds.

2010

Towers managed routine knockout victories over Yavor Marinchev and Ladislav Kovarik.

Professional boxing record

|-
|align="center" colspan=8|14 Wins (11 knockouts, 3 decisions) 
|-
| align="center" style="border-style: none none solid solid; background: #e3e3e3"|Result
| align="center" style="border-style: none none solid solid; background: #e3e3e3"|Record
| align="center" style="border-style: none none solid solid; background: #e3e3e3"|Opponent
| align="center" style="border-style: none none solid solid; background: #e3e3e3"|Type
| align="center" style="border-style: none none solid solid; background: #e3e3e3"|Round
| align="center" style="border-style: none none solid solid; background: #e3e3e3"|Date
| align="center" style="border-style: none none solid solid; background: #e3e3e3"|Location
| align="center" style="border-style: none none solid solid; background: #e3e3e3"|Notes
|-align=center
|Win
|
|align=left| Hrvoje Kisicek
|TKO
|6 (6)
|29 Nov 2014
|align=left| York Hall, Bethnal Green, London
|align=left|
|-
|Lose
|
|align=left| Lucas Browne
|TKO
|5 (12)
|2 Nov 2013
|align=left| Ice Arena, Hull
|align=left|
|-
|Win
|
|align=left| Gregory Tony
|TKO
|9
|16 Jun 2012
|align=left| Manchester Velodrome, Manchester
|align=left|
|-
|Win
|
|align=left| Harold Sconiers
|TKO
|5
|24 Mar 2012
|align=left| Ponds Forge, Sheffield, Yorkshire
|align=left|
|-
|Win
|
|align=left| Yuri Bihoutseu
|TKO
|3
|24 Sep 2011
|align=left| Ponds Forge, Sheffield, Yorkshire
|align=left|
|-
|Win
|
|align=left| Ismail Abdoul
|PTS
|8
|25 Jun 2011
|align=left| Hillsborough Leisure Centre, Sheffield, Yorkshire
|align=left|
|-
|Win
|
|align=left| Raman Sukhaterin
|RTD
|4
|16 Apr 2011
|align=left| MEN Arena, Manchester
|align=left|
|-
|Win
|
|align=left| Daniel Bispo
|TKO
|2
|26 Feb 2011
|align=left| Reebok Stadium, Bolton, Greater Manchester
|align=left|
|-
|Win
|
|align=left| Ladislav Kovarik
|TKO
|1
|21 May 2010
|align=left| Ponds Forge, Sheffield, Yorkshire
|align=left|
|-
|Win
|
|align=left| Yavor Marinchev
|TKO
|2
|16 Apr 2010
|align=left| Robin Park Centre, Wigan, Greater Manchester
|align=left|
|-
|Win
|
|align=left| Lee Mountford
|TKO
|1
|20 Dec 2009
|align=left| Octagon Centre, Sheffield, Yorkshire
|align=left|
|-
|Win
|
|align=left| Jason Callum
|RTD
|3
|24 Oct 2009
|align=left| Sheffield City Hall, Sheffield, Yorkshire
|align=left|
|-
|Win
|
|align=left| Michal Skierniewski
|RTD
|2
|3 Oct 2009
|align=left| Altrincham Ice Dome, Altrincham, Greater Manchester
|align=left|
|-
|Win
|
|align=left| Chris Woollas
|TKO
|2
|5 Sep 2009
|align=left| Watford Colosseum, Watford, Hertfordshire
|align=left|
|-
|Win
|
|align=left| Howard Daley
|PTS
|4
|18 Jul 2009
|align=left| MEN Arena, Manchester
|align=left|
|-
|Win
|
|align=left| Chris Woollas
|PTS
|4
|13 Jun 2009
|align=left| Robin Park Centre, Wigan, Greater Manchester
|align=left|
|}

References

External links
 

English male boxers
Heavyweight boxers
Living people
1979 births